George Milner may refer to:

 George Milner (British Army officer) (1760–1836), general officer of the British Army
 George Milner (footballer) (1938–2005), Australian rules footballer
 George R. Milner, archaeologist